Krišjāņi Parish is an administrative unit of Balvi Municipality in the Latgale region of Latvia (Prior to the 2009 reforms it was part of Balvi District).

Towns, villages and settlements of Krišjāņi Parish 

Balvi Municipality
Parishes of Latvia
Latgale